The 2018 Meath Intermediate Football Championship is the 92nd edition of the Meath GAA's premier club Gaelic football tournament for Intermediate graded teams in County Meath, Ireland. The tournament consists of 18 teams, with the winner going on to represent Meath in the Leinster Intermediate Club Football Championship. The championship starts with a group stage and then progresses to a knock out stage.

The draw for the group stages of the championship were made on 5 March 2018 with the games commencing on the weekend of 15 April 2018.

Meath Hill were promoted to the middle grade after a 24-year exodus when securing the J.F.C. crown in 2017.

This was Duleek/Bellewstown's first ever period as an Intermediate club after spending 10 years as a senior club since being established from the Duleek and Bellewstown clubs in 2008. 

Longwood beat Ballinlough by 0-11 to 0-7 in the 2018 final to win their first Meath Intermediate Football title since 1942.
St. Ultan's were relegated to the 2019 Meath Junior Football Championship. They will play at the junior grade for the first time since 2006.

Team changes
The following teams have changed division since the 2017 championship season.

From I.F.C.
Promoted to 2018 S.F.C.
 Curraha - (Intermediate Champions)

Relegated to 2018 J.F.C.
 Ballivor

To I.F.C.
Relegated from 2017 S.F.C.
 Duleek/Bellewstown

Promoted from 2017 J.F.C.
 Meath Hill - (Junior 'A' Champions)

Participating teams
The teams taking part in the 2018 Meath Intermediate Football Championship are:

Group stage
There are 3 groups called Group A,B and C. The 2 top finishers in each group and the third-place finisher in Group A will qualify for the quarter finals. The third placed teams in Group B and C will qualify for a Preliminary Quarter Final, with the winner earning a place in last eight. The bottom finishers of each group will qualify for the Relegation Play-off.

The draw for the group stages of the championship were made on 5 March 2018 with the games commencing on the weekend of 15 April 2018.

Group A

Round 1
 Ballinabrackey 0-9, 0-5 Trim, Clonard, 8/4/2018, 

 St. Michael's 0-9, 0-9 Nobber, Drumconrath, 8/4/2018, 

 St. Ultan's 1-12, 0-14 Walterstown, Dunganny, 11/4/2018, 

Round 2
 Trim 2-15, 0-9 Walterstown, Dunshaughlin, 20/4/2018, 

 Ballinabrackey 3-13, 3-10 St. Michael's, Pairc Tailteann, 21/4/2018, 

 Nobber 3-14, 2-10 St. Ultan's, Kilmainham, 21/4/2018, 

Round 3
 St. Michael's 1-14, 0-14 Walterstown, Castletown, 27/7/2018, 

 Ballinabrackey 2-12, 0-11 Nobber, Athboy, 28/7/2018, 

 Trim 2-17, 2-5 St. Ultan's, Pairc Tailteann, 28/7/2018, 

Round 4
 Walterstown 1-15, 1-13 Nobber, Castletown, 10/8/2018, 

 Trim 1-15, 1-12 St. Michael's, Athboy, 11/8/2018, 

 Ballinabrackey 2-14, 2-8 St. Ultan's, Kildalkey, 12/8/2018,

Round 5
 St. Michael's 1-20, 2-9 St. Ultan's, Ballinlough, 23/8/2018, 

 Walterstown 3-8, 2-10 Ballinabrackey, Longwood, 23/8/2018, 

 Nobber 3-7, 1-8 Trim, Brew's Hill, 23/8/2018,

Group B

Round 1
 Syddan 2-10, 2-5 Drumbaragh, Simonstown, 7/4/2018, 

 Longwood 3-12, 1-13 Dunderry, Pairc Tailteann, 8/4/2018, 

 Meath Hill 1-17, 3-11 Kilmainham, Carlanstown, 14/4/2018, 

Round 2
 Longwood 2-13, 2-11 Kilmainham, Brews Hill, 20/4/2018, 

 Dunderry 2-14, 1-9 Drumbaragh, Athboy, 21/4/2018, 

 Meath Hill 0-14, 0-8 Syddan, Drumconrath, 21/4/2018, 

Round 3
 Dunderry 1-16, 0-6 Kilmainham, Trim, 29/7/2018, 

 Syddan 4-9, 2-12 Longwood, Trim, 29/7/2018, 

 Meath Hill 1-16, 2-9 Drumbaragh, Pairc Tailteann, 29/7/2018, 

Round 4
 Drumbaragh 1-10, 2-7 Kilmainham, Kells, 10/8/2018, 

 Syddan 0-18, 2-9 Dunderry, Bohermeen, 11/8/2018, 

 Longwood 1-19, 0-7 Meath Hill, Bective, 12/8/2018, 

Round 5
 Drumbaragh 1-15, 1-15 Longwood, Dunganny, 24/8/2018, 

 Syddan 0-17, 0-10 Kilmainham, Moynalty, 24/8/2018,
 Dunderry 1-12, 0-10 Meath Hill, Cortown, 24/8/2018,

Group C

Round 1
 Bective 1-10, 1-7 Oldcastle, Pairc Tailteann, 7/4/2018, 

 Duleek/Bellewstown 1-10, 1-5 Castletown, Syddan, 8/4/2018, 

 Donaghmore/Ashbourne 'B' 1-9, 0-11 Ballinlough, Martry, 8/4/2018, 

Round 2
 Ballinlough 2-9, 1-11 Bective, Carlanstown, 20/4/2018, 

 Donaghmore/Ashbourne 'B' 4-10, 1-12 Castletown, Seneschalstown, 21/4/2018, 

 Oldcastle 1-15, 1-9 Duleek/Bellewstown, Kilberry, 21/4/2018, 

Round 3
 Ballinlough 2-10, 1-11 Oldcastle, Moylagh, 29/7/2018, 

 Bective 2-13, 1-12 Castletown, Waltesrtown, 29/7/2018, 

 Duleek/Bellewstown 1-21, 0-10 Donaghmore/Ashbourne 'B', Donore, 29/7/2018, 

Round 4
 Ballinlough 0-13, 0-12 Duleek/Bellewstown, Skryne, 10/8/2018, 

 Bective 1-11, 1-8 Donaghmore/Ashbourne 'B', Ratoath, 11/8/2018, 

 Oldcastle 2-11, 0-8 Castletown, Kilmainham, 12/8/2018, 

Round 5
 Duleek/Bellewstown 2-12, 0-12 Bective, Seneschalstown, 25/8/2018, 

 Ballinlough 6-8, 2-13 Castletown, Carlanstown, 25/8/2018, 

 Oldcastle 5-13, 1-9 Donaghmore/Ashbourne 'B', Bohermeen, 25/8/2018,

Knock-Out Stage

The winners and runners up of the three groups and the third placed team of Group A automatically qualify for the quarter finals. The third placed teams in Groups B and C play off to determine the team that completes the quarter final lineup.

Preliminary Quarter-Final

Quarter-finals

Semi-finals

Final

Relegation Play-Off Group
The three bottom teams from each group enter the relegation play-off group and play each other in a round robin basis.

The team with the worst record after two matches will be relegated to the 2019 Junior 'A' Championship.

 Game 1: Kilmainham 4-11, 0-9 St. Ultan's, Cortown, 7/9/2018, 

 Game 2: Castletown 0-17- 1-11 St. Ultan's, Carlanstown 24/9/2018, 
 Game 3: Castletown -vs- Kilmainham, (not required)

Leinster Intermediate Club Football Championship

Round 1:
 St. Mochta's 1-10, 0-11 Longwood, Ardee, 29/10/2018,

References

External links

Meath Intermediate Football Championship
Meath Intermediate Football Championship
Meath IFC